Brucella thiophenivorans is a gram-negative, oxidase-positive non-spore-forming non-motile bacteria from the genus of Brucella which was isolated from waste water in Germany.

References

External links
Type strain of Ochrobactrum thiophenivorans at BacDive -  the Bacterial Diversity Metadatabase

 

Hyphomicrobiales
Bacteria described in 2008